Bela Mukherjee (1921 – 25 June 2009) was an Indian singer and the wife of singer and music director Hemanta Mukherjee. She recorded a number of songs with her husband.

Mukherjee died in a private hospital in south Kolkata on 25 June 2009, at the age of 88. She had been admitted to the hospital on 15 June 2009. She was cremated at Keoratala. She was survived by her children, a son, Jayanta and a daughter, Ranu.

References

2009 deaths
Singers from Kolkata
Year of birth uncertain
20th-century Indian singers
21st-century Indian women singers
21st-century Indian singers
Women musicians from West Bengal
20th-century Indian women singers